Maureen is a feminine given name. 

Maureen may also refer to:

 Maureen (album), a 2011 album by Joy Denalane
 "Maureen", a song from Eddie Money's 1979 album, Life for the Taking
 "Maureen", a song from Nick Lowe and His Cowboy Outfit, 1984
 "Maureen", a song from Sade's 1985 album, Promise
 "Maureen", a song from Fountains of Wayne's 2005 compilation album, Out-of-State Plates
 "Maureen", a song from Young Knives' 2013 album, Sick Octave

See also
 
 "Maureen, Maureen", a song from John Prine's 1984 album, Aimless Love